Narkedimilli is a village in Dr. B.R. Ambedkar Konaseema district of the Indian state of Andhra Pradesh. It is located in Atreyapuram Mandal of Amalapuram revenue division. Agriculture is the main source of income as it is located beside Godavari. Paddy is the main crop, followed by sugarcane and bananas.

Population

References 

Villages in Atreyapuram mandal